John S. Murray (August 18, 1925 – October 17, 2007) was an American politician in the state of Washington. He served in the Washington House of Representatives from 1967 to 1971 and in the Senate from 1971 to 1979.

References

2007 deaths
1925 births
Republican Party Washington (state) state senators
Republican Party members of the Washington House of Representatives
20th-century American politicians
People from Albany, Missouri